XHJZ-FM is a radio station on 92.9 FM in Ciudad Jiménez, Chihuahua. The station is owned by Grupo BM Radio and carries a grupera format known as La Campera.

History
XHJZ began as XEJZ-AM 1320, receiving its concession on November 11, 1952. It was owned by Elia Barraza de Rivas until 1966, when the concession transferred to María Elena Torres de Orpinel. The station would be owned by Torres (later known as Torres García) or her estate until 2012.

It migrated to FM in 2011 on 92.9 MHz. From 2012 to 2015, the station was owned by Jorge Cruz Ramos López.

References

Radio stations in Chihuahua